Edward Harington (c. 1526–c. 1600), of Ridlington, Rutland, was an English politician.

He was the son of John Harington and Elizabeth Moton. His brother, James, was MP for Rutland.

He was a Member (MP) of the Parliament of England for Fowey in 1572.

References

1526 births
1600 deaths
English MPs 1572–1583
People from Rutland